Bradyrhynchoides is a genus of broad-nosed weevils in the beetle family Curculionidae. There are at least two described species in Bradyrhynchoides.

Species
These two species belong to the genus Bradyrhynchoides:
 Bradyrhynchoides constrictus Pierce, 1913 i c g b
 Bradyrhynchoides rugicollis (Sharp, 1891) c g
Data sources: i = ITIS, c = Catalogue of Life, g = GBIF, b = Bugguide.net

References

Further reading

 
 
 
 

Entiminae
Articles created by Qbugbot